Chris Burns (born December 12, 1972 in Greenwich, Connecticut) is a former professional Canadian football offensive lineman who played eleven seasons in the Canadian Football League for five different teams. He was named CFL East All-Star in 1999 and 2000, and was a part of one Grey Cup championship team with the Hamilton Tiger-Cats in 1999. Burns was an All-American Offensive Tackle college football at Portland State University.

External links
Bio

1972 births
Living people
Calgary Stampeders players
Canadian football offensive linemen
Hamilton Tiger-Cats players
Ottawa Renegades players
Ottawa Rough Riders players
Sportspeople from Greenwich, Connecticut
Portland State Vikings football players
Saskatchewan Roughriders players